{{Infobox television
| image                = Housos cast.jpg
| caption              = The cast of Housos
| alt_name             = Housos vs Virus: The Lockdown (Season 3)
Housos: The Thong Warrior (Season 4)
| genre                = 
| creator              = Paul Fenech
| writer               = Paul Fenech
| director             = Paul Fenech
| narrated             = 
| starring             = 
| theme_music_composer =
| opentheme            = 
| endtheme             = 
| composer             = 
| country              = Australia
| language             = English
| num_seasons          = 4
| num_episodes         = 28
| list_episodes        = #Episodes
| location             = Smithfield, NSW
| runtime              = 25 minutes
| company              = 
| distributor          = 
| channel              =
| picture_format       = 
| audio_format         = Stereo
| first_aired          = 
| related              = Pizza, Swift and Shift Couriers, Bogan Hunters,Dumb Criminals}} Housos is an Australian comedy television series created by Paul Fenech for SBS, that screened on SBS One. The series is a satirical parody of low income Australian residents of fictional suburb Sunnyvale, New South Wales, who are living in Housing Commission public housing.  In 2014, the series won the Logie Award for Most Outstanding Light Entertainment Program.

On 1 November 2012, a film based on the series was released in Australian cinemas, titled Housos vs. Authority. On 9 September 2012 it was announced that Housos would return for a second series, which premiered 22 July 2013. On 27 November 2014 another film based on and continuing the storyline of the series entitled Fat Pizza vs. Housos was released. In May 2020, a third season was announced to be airing on 7mate titled "Housos vs Virus: The Lockdown" and centred around how the characters dealt with the COVID-19 pandemic, which premiered on 26 October 2020. In February 2021, the series was renewed for a fourth season, titled "Housos: The Thong Warrior", which premiered on 7mate on 25 May 2022.

Cast
The majority of the cast of Housos are from Fenech's two previous series, Pizza and Swift and Shift Couriers. Some of the cast went on to star in the successful series Bogan Hunters on 7mate.

Elle Dawe as Sharon "Shazza" Jones, Dazza's de facto & mother of Holden.
Paul Fenech as Frank "Franky" Falzoni, Dazza's Best Friend
Fenech also appears as Franky's cousin, Pauly Falzoni from Pizza during series 2.
Jason "Jabba" Davis as Darren "Dazza" Smith, Shazza's de facto & Franky's Best Friend (series 1 and 2, flashbacks in series 3 and 4)
Kevin Taumata as Kevin Takamata, Franky & Dazza's Friend & Vanessa's de facto
Kyrah Brock-Fenton as Holden Jones, Shazza's grown-up daughter (series 3 & 4)
Vanessa Davis as Vanessa "Nessa" Talawahoo, Kevin's painful de facto.
Ian Turpie as Wazza Jones, Shazza's Dad / Narrator of the Show (series 1)
Kiri-Leigh Schmitt as Kylie Horfoot, Franky's de facto (series 1)
Sabeena Manalis as Sabeena, Franky's cousin (Series 1)
Crystal Sullivan as Crystal, Kylie's Sister & Franky's on and off (de facto Frank's friend with benefits) (series 1)
Amanda Keller as Christina Rees, Sunnyvale Mayor (series 1)
Barry Crocker as the premier (series 1)
Melissa Tkautz as Cheree, Franky's Ex de facto (series 1)
Liz Harper replaces Melissa Tkautz as Cheree in series 2 and 3.
Andrew Ausage as Junior, Cheree's Samoan de facto
Angry Anderson as Angry the Bikie, Leader of the Hunterz Bikie Gang
Davey Cooper as Johnno, Angry's Dwarf-Sized Brother
Maret Archer as Berryl, Dazza's Mum (series 1, 2 and 4, flashbacks in series 3)
Stuart Rawe as Reg, Berryl's mentally disabled de facto as well as being Dazza's de facto stepfather (series 1, 2 and 4, flashbacks in series 3)
Chris Franklin as Darryl "Dazza" James, Dazza's Smith's cousin and Shazza's former de facto. (series 1, flashback series 3)
Sam Greco as Dino Falzoni, Franky's gambling addicted brother who lives in Melbourne
George Kapiniaris as George, Franky's married in Greek cousin and Sabeena's father (series 1), later seen in series 2 as Donald Bradman's ghost as Dazza's Hallucinating 
Giani Leon as Jaydog, Holden's boyfriend who is later revealed to be Franky and Cheree's son (series 3)
Alex Romano as Jimmy the Junkie, the leader of the junkie crew (series 2)
Tahir Bilgic as Habib, Sunnyvale Assassins Member (series 1 & 2)
Rob Shehadie as Rocky, Sunnyvale Assassins Member (series 1 & 2)
Ashur Simon as Abdul, Sunnyvale Assassins Member
Ara Natarian as Ara, Sunnyvale Assassins Member (series 1 & 2)
Mohammed Hammoud as Mo, Sunnyvale Assassins Member (series 1 & 2)
Joe Mifsud as Samira Shabaz, Habib's mum who wears a burqa
Anthony Salame as the service station worker and Thwayne the McDonald's manager who dates Kylie on and off in series 1.
Nicole Sharrock as Hayley, Franky's de facto / Barmaid who is also in Housos vs. Authority and Fat Pizza vs. Housos (series 2 & 4)
Amarli Inez as Candy, Franky's On-Off Girlfriend (series 2)
Derek Boyer as Bubbles, Junior's Cousin who harasses Dazza while in prison
John Mangos as himself (appearing as a news presenter)
Murray Harman as Officer Richard Head a Sunnyvale-based police officer 
Garry Who as Officer Garry Kock a Sunnyvale-based police officer 
James Thomas as himself (appearing as a current affairs reporter in series 2)
Renzo Renalto as Renzo, Centerlink case worker
Waseem Khan as Waseem, An Indian Centerlink case worker
Gregory King as Tank the bikie, Vice president of the Hunterz Bikie Gang (series 1 & 2)
Jordan Shanks as a current affairs reporter in series 4

 Episodes 

 Series 1 (2011) 

 Series 2 (2013) 

 Series 3 (2020) 

 Series 4 (2022) 

 Notes 
  "Junkies" first aired on SBS Viceland and later on SBS One.
  Viewers from broadcast airing on SBS Viceland.

ControversyHousos came under fire from a number of western Sydney residents, who had called on SBS not to put the series on air. A petition which was initiated by residents on a housing commission property received thousands of signatures, and the efforts gained support from local politicians. Mount Druitt MP Richard Amery presented the petition in Parliament in late April 2011. Housos was also at the centre of a controversy in February 2011 when Nine Network's A Current Affair, initially claimed that the series was "reality TV". Nine Network later said that the mistake originated from an 18-year-old woman working at ninemsn. SBS was also forced to defend the show by stating that the series was not receiving funding from the government, and it was instead being funded by the network's own revenue raising activities.

MoviesHousos vs. Authority (2012)Fat Pizza vs. Housos (2014)Bogan Hunters (2015)Dumb Criminals (2015)Fat Pizza vs. Housos Live (2016)

Awards and nominations
Australian Writers' Guild
2011: Comedy – Situation or Narrative ("Pregnant", nominated)
Logie Awards
2014: Most Outstanding Light Entertainment Program (won)

ARIA Music Awards
The ARIA Music Awards are a set of annual ceremonies presented by Australian Recording Industry Association (ARIA), which recognise excellence, innovation, and achievement across all genres of the music of Australia. They commenced in 1987. 

! 
|-
| 2013 || Housos Live || ARIA Award for Best Comedy Release ||  || 
|-

See also
 Fat Pizza vs. Housos List of Australian television series
 Pizza Housos vs. Authority Swift and Shift Couriers Bogan Hunters''

References

External links 
 
 

2011 Australian television series debuts
Australian comedy television series
English-language television shows
Special Broadcasting Service original programming
7mate original programming
Television controversies in Australia
Television shows set in New South Wales